María Teresa Lozano Imízcoz (born July 31, 1946) is a Spanish emeritus professor and mathematician. She studies topology principally in three dimensions. She has been given a Real Sociedad Matemática Española (RSME) medal for her career and as a trailblazer for women to be involved in mathematical research.

Life
Lozano was born in Pamplona in 1946. In 1969 Imízcoz obtained a degree and five years later she completed her doctorate in mathematics at the University of Zaragoza. Her postdoctoral work began at the University of Wisconsin where she was an honorary fellow. In 1978 she returned to Spain where she became a professor at the University of Zaragoza.

In 1990 she was made the Professor of Geometry and Topology. She was the first professor and the first director in her university's Faculty of Sciences. She was also the first emeritus professor of her faculty.

Memberships
In 1996 she became an Academician of the Royal Academy of Exact, Physical, Chemical and Natural Sciences of Zaragoza. In 2006 she became a Corresponding Academician of the Royal Academy of Exact, Physical and Natural Sciences.

In 2016 she was awarded the Royal Spanish Mathematical Society (RSME) Medal in recognition of the 40 years that she had contributed to the mathematics profession. The citation mentioned her dissemination work and her studies with Prof. Hugh Michael Hilden and Vicente Montesinos on the theory of knots and three-dimensional topology. The newspapers also mentioned her as a trailblazer for women to be involved in mathematical research.

References

1946 births
Living people
People from Pamplona
Topologists
20th-century Spanish mathematicians
Spanish women mathematicians
University of Zaragoza alumni
Academic staff of the University of Zaragoza
21st-century Spanish mathematicians